Kim Young-min (born 5 December 1985) is a South Korean sport shooter.

He participated at the 2018 ISSF World Shooting Championships, winning a medal.

References

External links

Living people
1985 births
South Korean male sport shooters
ISSF pistol shooters
Sport shooters from Seoul
Asian Games medalists in shooting
Shooters at the 2014 Asian Games
Asian Games bronze medalists for South Korea
Medalists at the 2014 Asian Games